John Osborne (1 December 1940 – 7 November 1998) was an  English football goalkeeper. He played for Chesterfield, West Bromwich Albion and Shamrock Rovers. Osborne was a member of Albion's great cup side of the late 1960s which played in 5 cup finals from 1966 to 1970, including the 1968 FA Cup final. His nickname was Bionic due to the plastic joint inserted in his finger.

He made his Rovers debut at Milltown under his old teammate Johnny Giles on 10 September 1978. He played 3 games in the 1978–79 European Cup Winners' Cup keeping 2 clean sheets giving him a total of 4 appearances for the Hoops.

In 2004, he was named as one of West Bromwich Albion's 16 greatest players, in a poll organised as part of the club's 125th anniversary celebrations.

Osborne was the commercial manager of Worcestershire County Cricket Club from 1986 to 1995, and played a significant part in the county's signing of long-time major sponsor MEB.

Honours
West Bromwich Albion
 FA Cup (1): 1968
 Football League Cup (1): 1966

References

External links
 Superstars in Stripes - John Osborne West Bromwich Albion F.C. Official Site

1940 births
1998 deaths
People from Barlborough
Footballers from Derbyshire
English footballers
Association football goalkeepers
Chesterfield F.C. players
West Bromwich Albion F.C. players
Walsall F.C. players
Shamrock Rovers F.C. players
League of Ireland players
FA Cup Final players